The Fan is an Australian sports television series first aired on Fox League in 2018. The show is on Tuesday nights at 7:30pm.

Presenters 

 Andrew Voss (2018–)
 Lara Pitt (2020–)

History 
The Fan began in 2018 as a show designed to present the sport through the eyes of Andrew Voss, a famous rugby league commentator and personality. The show regularly hosts former and current players as well as other personalities throughout the sport.

In 2020, Lara Pitt was added as a presenter alongside Voss after League Life was dissolved.

Series overview

Episodes

See also

 List of Australian television series

References

External links

2018 Australian television series debuts
2010s Australian television series
English-language television shows
Australian sports television series
Fox Sports (Australian TV network) original programming
Rugby league television shows